Diocese of Argyll and the Isles can refer to:

 Diocese of Argyll and The Isles (Episcopal), Scottish Episcopal Church
 Roman Catholic Diocese of Argyll and the Isles, Roman Catholic Church